Bukkehøe or Bukkehøi is a mountain in Lom Municipality in Innlandet county, Norway. The mountain is surrounded by several other notable mountains including Storjuvtinden, Svellnosbreahesten, Store Tverråtinden, and Midtre Tverråtinden to the northeast; Sauhøi to the west; Bukkeholstindene and Tverrbottindene to the southwest; Store Styggehøe and Bukkeholshøe to the southeast; and Lindbergtinden to the east.

Name
The first element is bukk which means 'buck' (as in a male reindeer). The last element is the finite form of hø which is a word for a 'large and round mountain'.

See also
List of mountains of Norway by height

References

Jotunheimen
Lom, Norway
Mountains of Innlandet